is a mountain located in Hinoemata, Fukushima Prefecture, Japan, in the Oze National Park. It is one of the 100 Famous Japanese Mountains.

See also

References

Mountains of Fukushima Prefecture